St. Mary's County, established in 1637, is a county located in the U.S. state of Maryland. As of the 2020 census, the population was 113,777. Its county seat is Leonardtown. The name is in honor of Mary, the mother of Jesus. St. Mary's County comprises the California-Lexington Park, Maryland Metropolitan Statistical Area, which also is included in the Washington-Baltimore-Arlington, DC-MD-VA-WV-PA Combined Statistical Area. It is part of the Southern Maryland region. The county was the home to the first Maryland Colony, and the first capital of the Colony of Maryland. Settled by English Catholics, it is considered to be the birthplace of religious freedom in North America, at a time when the British colonies were settled primarily by Protestants. The county is home to the Patuxent River Naval Air Station and St. Mary's College of Maryland. Traditionally, St. Mary's County has been known for its unique and historic culture of Chesapeake Bay tidewater farming, fishing, and crabbing communities. But with the advent of the military bases, growth of an extensive defense contractor presence, and the growth of St. Mary's College of Maryland, as well as increasing numbers of long-distance Washington, D.C. commuters, it has been undergoing a decades-long transformation which has seen the county's population double since 1970.

History

Settlement
The settlement of Lord Baltimore's Maryland began with the arrival of passengers from England at St. Clement's Island in the Potomac River in what is now southwestern St. Mary's County on March 25, 1634, and the annual anniversary of this landing is celebrated as Maryland Day. The passengers arrived in two vessels, the Ark and the Dove that had set sail from the Isle of Wight on November 22, 1633. The county is the site of the first Catholic Mass celebrated in one of the original thirteen colonies (after they had become English colonies). Earlier dates of masses being said were during 1526–1527 at San Miguel de Gualdape.

Due to the small size of the island and its lack of resources, there was no intention to make a permanent settlement on the island. Instead St. Clement's was used as a base for the settlers while scouting for a more suitable site. This was how a bluff overlooking the nearby St. Mary's River was chosen for numerous reasons, and became the site of the first permanent settlement. It would soon be named, "St. Mary's City".

St. Mary's City, Maryland is the site of the first Maryland Capitol and remained so for more than 50 years, until 1695, when the state capital was moved to Annapolis.

Today Historic St. Mary's City is a major attraction in Maryland with four museums, a reconstructed colonial village, and the reconstructed Maryland Dove settlers ship. It also has become one of the top archeological research sites in North America.

St. Mary's County was the first county established in Maryland, in 1637, probably by an order of the governor.

In 1649, Lord Baltimore, with the Maryland General Assembly, passed the Maryland Toleration Act, which provided religious freedom for any (Christian) sect and which was the first law of its kind in the New World. There is a statue in St. Mary's City commemorating this event, along with extensive museums, a reconstructed Colonial town, living history actors, and a replica of the Maryland Dove.

Miscellaneous historical data
St. Mary's County is where Maryland's leading war ace, (WWII) Capt. Walter Duke, and the professional wrestler, Scott Hall, grew up.
St. Mary's County was the birthplace of Dashiell Hammett and Orlando "Tubby" Smith, head basketball coach at High Point University. The largest employer is Patuxent River Naval Air Station and its related aerospace contract firms. There are both Amish and Mennonite communities in the county who follow traditional ways. Tobacco, once a dominant crop, has declined in recent years. The Maryland International Raceway at Budd's Creek attracts many automobile racing enthusiasts.

Historic buildings
St. Mary's County has some of the oldest extant buildings in English North America. Many of these properties are listed on the National Register of Historic Places. These buildings range through many historical periods, from the 1600s to the 1800s. There are notable buildings of the early twentieth century, as well.

Memorial
The United States Colored Troops Memorial Statue is a memorial to the more than 700 African-American soldiers and sailors from St. Mary's County who served among the Union forces during the American Civil War. The memorial site includes an educational display and special celebrations are held there each year.

Politics and government

In presidential elections, St. Mary's County leans strongly toward the Republican Party. No Democrat has won the county since Jimmy Carter did so in 1976. In 2020, Donald Trump received the lowest percentage for a Republican candidate since Bob Dole in 1996.

|}

St. Mary's County is governed by county commissioners, the traditional form of county government in Maryland.

Board of commissioners

County executive
The county commissioners exercise such executive powers as exist in the government of the county.

Circuit court judges
 Hon. Amy D. Lorenzini
 Hon. Michael J. Stamm, administrative judge
 Hon. Joseph Stanalonis

Law enforcement
St. Mary's County has the oldest documented sheriff's office in Maryland and one of the oldest in the United States. In 1637, James Baldridge was appointed sheriff. Since 1776, sheriffs in St. Mary's County have been determined by election. Steven A. Hall is the current sheriff.  He was sworn in on December 5, 2022.

Geography
It is the second-largest county in Maryland by total area.

Located on the St. Mary's Peninsula, St. Mary's County is largely bordered by water: the Patuxent River (northeast), the Chesapeake Bay (east), the Potomac River (southwest), and the Wicomico River (west). Its coastline has many coves, tidal creeks, bays, and inlets. Many coastal areas are made up of mixed clay-and-sand cliffs and bluffs, which protect many parts of the county from storm surges, however, there are low-lying coastal areas with coarse sand or gravel beaches or tidal marshlands, as well. The county has a tiny exclave on the other side of the Potomac river due to the Maryland-Virginia border cutting through a beach near the little wicomico river.

The interior of much of the county is hilly to varying degrees, with forests and agricultural fields. There also are coastal plain areas, much of which are under agriculture or under new development. Residential development has been increasing steadily for decades.

The county's very extensive waters are mostly brackish, ranging from significant degrees of saltwater in tidal areas that are on or near the Chesapeake Bay, to a greater predominance of freshwater and lower-salt-concentrations in its interior tidal waterways and also further up its bordering rivers.

Climate
According to the Köppen climate classification, the county has a humid subtropical climate (Cfa.) According to the Trewartha climate classification, the climate is Cf or oceanic (Do) depending on whether eight or seven months average above 50 °F (10 °C,) respectively. Average monthly temperatures in Leonardtown range from 36.3 °F in January to 78.1 °F in July.

Adjacent counties
Calvert County (northeast)
Charles County (northwest)
Somerset County (southeast)
Northumberland County, Virginia (South)
Westmoreland County, Virginia (southwest)
Dorchester County (east)

St. Mary's County borders Virginia, across the Potomac River. St. Mary's County waters also are bordered by Virginia's territorial waters in Potomac tributary mouths on the Virginia side, tidal interface zones, and the Chesapeake Bay. Sometimes, water rights in all of these areas are still disputed.

Demographics

2020 census

Note: the US Census treats Hispanic/Latino as an ethnic category. This table excludes Latinos from the racial categories and assigns them to a separate category. Hispanics/Latinos can be of any race.

2010 census
As of the 2010 United States Census, there were 105,151 people, 37,604 households, and 27,084 families residing in the county. The racial makeup of the county was 78.6% white, 14.3% black or African American, 2.5% Asian, 0.4% American Indian, 0.1% Pacific islander, 1.0% from other races, and 3.2% from two or more races. Those of Hispanic or Latino origin made up 3.8% of the population. In terms of ancestry, 17.4% were Irish, 17.3% were German, 16.0% were English, 8.8% were American, and 5.2% were Italian.

Of the 37,604 households, 38.5% had children under the age of 18 living with them, 55.5% were married couples living together, 11.7% had a female householder with no husband present, 28.0% were non-families, and 21.8% of all households were made up of individuals. The average household size was 2.72 and the average family size was 3.18. The median age was 36.0 years.

The median income for a household in the county was $80,053 and the median income for a family was $89,385. Males had a median income of $61,971 versus $46,487 for females. The per capita income for the county was $34,000. About 4.7% of families and 7.1% of the population were below the poverty line, including 9.1% of those under age 18 and 7.3% of those age 65 or over.

2000 census
As of 2010, there were 105,000 people in St. Mary's County, up from 84,000 in the year 2000. families residing in the county. The population density was 238 people per square mile (92/km2). There were 34,081 housing units at an average density of 36 persons/km2 (94 persons/sq mi). The racial makeup of the county was 81.57% White, 13.92% African American, 0.34% Native American, 1.80% Asian, 0.07% Pacific Islander, 0.61% from other races, and 1.68% from two or more races. Hispanic or Latino of any race were 2.00% of the population. 14.8% were of American, 13.9% German, 13.3% English and 12.1% Irish ancestry.

There were 30,642 households, out of which 25.90% had children under the age of 18 living with them, 46.10% were married couples living together, 15.10% have a woman whose husband does not live with her, and 34.90% were non-families. 29.40% of all households were made up of individuals, and 12.90% had someone living alone who was 65 years of age or older. The average household size was 2.72 and the average family size was 3.14.

In the county, the population was spread out, with 27.90% under the age of 18, 15.70% from 18 to 24, 29.50% from 25 to 44, 22.20% from 45 to 64, and 9.10% who were 65 years of age or older. The median age was 34 years. For every 100 females there were 101.80 males. For every 100 females age 18 and over, there were 119.10 males.

The median income for a household in the county was $54,706, and the median income for a family was $61,397. Males had a median income of $27,496 versus $23,035 for females. The per capita income for the county was $22,662. 7.20% of the population and 5.20% of families were below the poverty line. Out of the total people living in poverty, 28.40% are under the age of 18 and 19.10% are 65 or older.

Amish and Old Order Mennonite community

St. Mary's County is home to an Amish community in the Mechanicsville area in the northern part of the county that consists of eight church districts and about 1,000 people. The Amish first came to the area in 1940 after some members left the Amish community in Lancaster County, Pennsylvania over a conflict with schooling. The Amish in St. Mary's County maintain dairy and produce farms along with small Amish businesses. There is also an Old Order Mennonite community in the county that stretches as far south as Loveville. In recent years, increasing development has threatened the Amish community.

Education
 St. Mary's College of Maryland is in St. Mary's City, Maryland and has been ranked "6th in the nation" under the category, " Public Liberal Arts Colleges", by the U.S. News & World Report 2014 University and College Rankings report. 
 The College of Southern Maryland is located in Leonardtown, Maryland.
 Southern Maryland Higher Education Center is located in California, Maryland.
 Paul Hall Center for Maritime Training and Education is a Merchant Marine school in Piney Point, Maryland.

Naval bases
The county has three naval bases:

 "Pax River", officially called the Naval Air Station Patuxent River, is the largest of the naval bases in the county. It is in Lexington Park, Maryland, and includes the headquarters of the Naval Air Systems Command and the Naval Test Pilot School, both of which play a significant role in the local economy, and trained many test pilots who went on to become astronauts, such as Alan Shepard, the first American to reach space, and John Glenn, the first American to reach orbit.
 "Webster Field" is a smaller naval annex and secondary airfield and it is located in Saint Inigoes. It used for avionics engineering testing and development.
 Coast Guard Station St. Inigoes (also in Saint Inigoes), technically two bases because it comprises two separate areas, however, it is all under the same command.

Transportation
Numerous state highways serve St. Mary's County, including:

 Maryland Route 4
 Maryland Route 5
 Maryland Route 6
 Maryland Route 234
 Maryland Route 235
 Maryland Route 236
 Maryland Route 237
 Maryland Route 238
 Maryland Route 239
 Maryland Route 242
 Maryland Route 243
 Maryland Route 244
 Maryland Route 245
 Maryland Route 246
 Maryland Route 247
 Maryland Route 249
 Maryland Route 470
 Maryland Route 471
 Maryland Route 472
 Maryland Route 489
 Maryland Route 520
 Maryland Route 584
 Maryland Route 712
 Maryland Route 863
 Maryland Route 868
 Maryland Route 944
 Maryland Route 945

Limited local buses are provided through St. Mary's Transit and commuter bus service to Washington, D.C. is provided by MTA. Southern Maryland Express shuttle services daily schedules to Baltimore (BWI), Dulles (IAD), and Ronald Reagan (DCA).

The nearest commercial airports are Reagan National Airport in Arlington County, Virginia and Baltimore Washington International Airport in suburban Baltimore.

St. Mary's County also is served by a general aviation airport, Captain Walter Duke Regional Airport near California, Maryland

Communities

Towns
 Leonardtown (county seat)

Census-designated places
The Census Bureau recognizes the following census-designated places in the county:

 California
 Callaway
 Charlotte Hall
 Golden Beach
 Lexington Park
 Mechanicsville
 Piney Point
 St. George Island
 Tall Timbers
 Wildewood

Unincorporated communities

 Abell
 Avenue
 Beachville-St. Inigoes
 Beauvue
 Bushwood
 Chaptico
 Clements
 Coltons Point
 Compton
 Dameron
 Drayden
 Great Mills
 Helen
 Hollywood
 Hopewell
 Huntersville
 Hurry
 Loveville
 Maddox
 Morganza
 Oakley
 Oakville
 Oraville
 Ridge
 St. Inigoes
 St. Mary's City
 Scotland
 Spencers Wharf
 Valley Lee

Notable sites
 Point Lookout State Park, a nationally recognized natural area and historic site, features a former Civil War prison camp, beaches, fishing, and camping
 St. Mary's City, the site of first settlement in the Maryland colony, includes four museums, a reconstructed colonial town, and a living history center 
 United States Colored Troops Memorial Statue, in Lexington Park, honors and tells story of 700 African-American soldiers and sailors from St. Mary's County who served in the Union forces during the American Civil War
 Patuxent River Naval Air Museum features Naval aviation history, the history of test pilots and naval aviation development at PAX River NAS, and many aircraft on display
 Solomons Island Naval recreation facility in nearby Solomons Island Maryland, accessed by bridge, is used by military and DOD personnel and families only. It is a guarded facility and ID is required
 Sotterley Plantation is a reconstructed antebellum plantation with a history museum that features pre-Civil War history
 USS Tulip monument and federal grave site for Civil War sailors who died in the explosion of a Union gunship in area waters in 1864 
 Point Lookout Light House
 Piney Point Lighthouse and Museum
 Cecils Old Mill museum, art gallery, and artists co-op in nearby Great Mills, Maryland
 National Register of Historic Places listings in St. Mary's County, Maryland many buildings in the county are listed, dating to the 1600s, 1700s, and 1800s
 Tudor Hall, St. Mary's County Historical Society (limited hours)

Notable residents
 Jerome Adams: served as the twentieth surgeon general of the United States from September 5, 2017, until January 20, 2021.
 Richard H. Alvey: chief justice of the Maryland Supreme Court, a federal judge in the 1870s and 1880s, born and raised in St. Marys County
 William H. Barnes: Medal of Honor recipient for valor in the Battle of Chaffin's Farm while serving in the Union Army during the Civil War, was a free African American farmer from St. Mary's County
 Margaret Brent: English immigrant to the first Colony of Maryland who lived in St. Mary's City, was an early (indirect) advocate for women's rights by asserting her own right to run an estate and vote, and was the first woman in the English North American colonies to appear before a court of the Common Law
 Leonard Calvert: leader of the first English settlers in Maryland and first governor of the Maryland Colony, lived in St. Mary's City
 Charles Calvert: 3rd Baron Baltimore (1637–1715), second long-term governor of the Maryland Colony (his Uncle Philip Calvert also governed before him, but only very briefly), lived in St. Mary's City
 Mary Chapin Carpenter: Grammy winning folk, country, and rock singer and songwriter who composed a song about St. Mary's County and has lived in St. Mary's County at various times
 Betty Currie: personal secretary to the president of the United States (Bill Clinton), personal secretary to the director of the Peace Corps
 Norton Dodge: economist, collector of dissident Soviet era art, smuggled thousands of Soviet dissident paintings, prints and sculptures out of communist Russia over a series of visits and at great risk to his own life and amassed one of the largest collections of Soviet-era art outside the Soviet Union, taught at St. Mary's College in St. Mary's City
 John Dorsey: also known as Johnny Dorsey, general manager of the Kansas City Chiefs professional football team, NCAA College Football winner, and professional football player whose pro football career was cut short due to injuries, born in Leonardtown
 William P. Duvall, U.S. Army major general, born on St. George Island
 Benedict Joseph Fenwick: Catholic Bishop of Boston from 1825 until his death in 1846, born in Leonardtown
 Henry Fowler: former member of the Maryland House of Delegates and of the Wisconsin State Assembly
 Michael Glaser: poet, educator, literary editor, the Poet Laureate of the State of Maryland from 2004 through 2009, was awarded the Andrew White Medal for contributions to intellectual and artistic life in Maryland, taught at St. Mary's College, and lives in St. Mary's County
 Alfred Gough: screenwriter and author of scripts for numerous Hollywood films, born and raised in Leonardtown
 Scott Hall: professional wrestling star and professional wrestling entrepreneur, born and raised in St. Mary's County, Maryland
 Dashiell Hammett: American author of hardboiled detective novels and short stories, was born in St. Mary's County
 James H. Harris: Medal of Honor recipient for heroism in the Battle of Chaffin's farm during the Civil War, an African American Union soldier who grew up as a free Black tenant farmer in Great Mills
 Robert E. Hogaboom: four-star Marine Corps general, chair of the Historic St. Mary's City Commission and advocate for decades for the reconstruction and development of Historic St. Mary's City
 Steny Hoyer: former State Senator and Democratic member of the United States House of Representatives, currently the House Majority Leader
 Louise Daniel Hutchinson: noted historian of African American history, was born in Ridge, Maryland
 Francis Scott Key: composer of the Star Spangled Banner, grew up in St. Mary's County
 Ted Koppel: journalist and former host of the news show Nightline, lived in Southern St. Mary's County
 William and Dinah Nuthead: established the first printing house in the Southern Colonies at St. Mary's City, Maryland
 J. Frank Raley: State Senator and state representative, trustee of St. Marys College of Maryland, credited for helping to establish St. Mary's College as a four-year institution and playing key roles in its development into a nationally top-ranked public college, born and raised in St. Mary's County
 Tubby Smith: college basketball coach, grew up in Scotland, Maryland
 William C. Somerville: author, historian, diplomat, War of 1812 soldier, born and raised in St. Mary's County
 Norwood Sothoron: athlete, soldier, commandant of Charlotte Hall Military Academy, inducted into the National Lacrosse Hall of Fame in 1972, born and raised in Charlotte Hall, Maryland
 Sylvester Stallone: award-winning actor and director who attended Charlotte Hall Military Academy and boarding school in St. Mary's County as a teenager
 Father Andrew White: Jesuit priest and settler on first voyage to establish the new Maryland colony, one of the founders of the first Catholic mission and parish in North America, was instrumental in negotiating peace and territory deals with the Piscataway Indian tribes in St. Marys County, lived in St. Marys City, Maryland

In popular culture
Grammy Award-winning singer and songwriter Mary Chapin Carpenter wrote a song about St. Mary's County, entitled, "Down in Mary's Land", in 1989 She is known for having great affection for St. Mary's County.

See also

 St. Mary's County Sheriff's Office
 St. Mary's Peninsula
 St. Mary's City, Maryland
 St. Mary's College of Maryland

References

External links

 Saint Mary's County government
 St. Mary's County Travel and Tourism
 Historic St. Mary's City Official website
 St. Marys College of Maryland website
 Historical photos of life in St. Mary's County provided by the Maryland State Archives
 Live Southern Maryland Weather
 Sheriff's office

 
Maryland counties
1637 establishments in Maryland
Maryland counties on the Potomac River
Populated places established in 1637
Maryland counties on the Chesapeake Bay